Modalasala is a 2010 Indian Kannada romantic drama film written and directed by Purushottham C. Somanathapura in his debut, produced by Yogesh Narayan and Mallikarjun Sankangoudar Gadag and stars Yash and Bhama in the lead roles. Rangayana Raghu, Tara, Avinash and Sharan feature in supporting roles.

Plot
The film is about two youngsters, both of whom are quite the ideal children. Imagine a girl who makes a guy wait hoping to get her parents to approve his proposal; or a guy who says, "I’ve met the girl's parents, I see them in her eyes". These are the things most typical families dream of, as they plan their kids’ futures.

The film has its funny moments and occasionally an overdose of sentimental scenes. The director has done a fairly decent job with the narrative and Yash impresses in his role as the lovelorn urban lad. His dancing skills deserve special mention — he’s easily one of the best in Sandalwood.

New girl Bhama makes a decent debut, though Deepu, who has dubbed for her, deserves equal applause. Rangayana Raghu and Tara excel, and the film shows Raghu in a different light, as opposed to his over-the-top comical roles.

Cast
 Yash as Karthik
 Bhama as Deepu
 Rangayana Raghu as Deepu's father
 Tara as Deepu's mother
 Avinash as Karthik's father
 Master Rakesh
 Master Manja
 Vishwa
 Lakshman
 Thimme Gowda
 Ramanand

Soundtrack

V. Harikrishna scored the film's background music and its soundtrack, with its lyrics written by V. Nagendra Prasad and Kaviraj. The track "Love Me Or Hate Me" was taken from the 1978 film Shankar Guru, the lyrics for which was written by Chi. Udayashankar. The soundtrack album consists of five tracks. The album was released in July 2010 in Bangalore.

Track listing

Reception

Critical response 

A critic from The Times of India scored the film at 3.5 out of 5 stars and says "Watch the movie with your family and wards to know the climax. Yash steals the show while Bhama too is superb. Rangayana Raghu and Tara are graceful. Hats off to brilliant cinematography by H C Venu. Music director V Harikrishna has scored some melodious tunes, especially the song Prathamaa (penned by V Nagendra Prasad)". Sunayana Suresh from DNA wrote "New girl Bhama makes a decent debut, though Deepu, who has dubbed for her, deserves equal applause. Rangayana Raghu and Tara excel, the film shows Raghu in a different light, as opposed to his over-the-top comical roles". A critic from Deccan Herald wrote "Venu’s camera work, which initially develops a cataract, and V Harikrishna’s score add polish to this neat film with a few cute moments. Modala Sala also makes some squirm at its climax, but then that’s again cinema". A critic from Bangalore Mirror wrote  "The star of the film, however,  is HC Venugopal, the cinematographer, by doing away with artificial lighting, but manages to show natural images as if he has invented some new colours. (A few trees are actually painted in artificial colour in one scene). The picturesque Coorg (hills, trees and waterfalls) gets a new showcase in his frames. The dialogues meander between being mundane and striking. But it is mostly the former. Easily avoidable".

Accolades 
58th Filmfare Awards South
 nominated, Best Supporting Actor – Kannada — Rangayana Raghu
 nominated, Best Supporting Actress – Kannada — Tara
 nominated, Best Female Playback Singer – Kannada — Sunitha Upadrashta for "Prathama"

2010 Suvarna Film Awards
 Best Supporting Actor — Rangayana Raghu
 Find of the Year — Purushottham C. Somanathapura

References

External links
 

2010s Kannada-language films
2010 films
Films scored by V. Harikrishna